Chelsea was a constituency used for elections to the London County Council between 1889 and the council's abolition, in 1965.  The seat shared boundaries with the UK Parliament constituency of the same name.

Councillors

Election results

In 1898, Horniman and Chapman tied on 3,675 votes after the initial count.  A recount reduced Chapman's vote total by two, so Horniman was elected.

References

London County Council constituencies
Politics of the Royal Borough of Kensington and Chelsea
Chelsea, London